Tinco District is one of eleven districts of the province Carhuaz in Peru.

References

Districts of the Carhuaz Province
Districts of the Ancash Region